Events from the year 1807 in Canada.

Incumbents
Monarch: George III

Federal government
Parliament of Lower Canada: 4th 
Parliament of Upper Canada: 4th

Governors
Governor of the Canadas: Robert Milnes
Governor of New Brunswick: Thomas Carleton
Governor of Nova Scotia: John Wentworth
Commodore-Governor of Newfoundland: John Holloway
Governor of Prince Edward Island: Joseph Frederick Wallet DesBarres

Events
 The slave trade is abolished in the British Empire, although slavery continues in the colonies.
 The Embargo Act aims at keeping US ships out of European conflicts.
 David Thompson crosses Rockies and builds a trading post at headwaters of Columbia River. NWC Upper Kootenay House is built by David Thompson.
 In the spring John Colter joins Manuel Lisa at the Platte River who winters on Yellowstone River at the mouth of the Bighorn River.
 The British ship Leopard searches the U.S. Chesapeake for deserters, kills some of the crew and takes Radford, who is hanged. Pending satisfaction, the United States close their ports to British ships, though reparation is tendered.
 Thomas Jefferson signs bill banning all foreign trade following British attacks on American shipping.
 Election of Ezekiel Hart in Trois-Rivières during a by-election on April 11.

Births
 May – William Workman, businessman and municipal politician (d.1878)
 August 31 – John Young, 1st Baron Lisgar, Governor General (d.1876)
 October 4 – Louis-Hippolyte Lafontaine, politician (d.1864) 
 December 14 – Francis Hincks, politician (d.1885)

Full date unknown
 Joseph Casavant, manufacturer of pipe organs (d.1874)

Deaths
 July 20 – Jean-Marie Ducharme, fur trader (b. 1723)

References 

 
Canada
07
1807 in North America